The consensus 1975 College Basketball All-American team, as determined by aggregating the results of four major All-American teams.  To earn "consensus" status, a player must win honors from a majority of the following teams: the Associated Press, the USBWA, The United Press International and the National Association of Basketball Coaches.

1975 Consensus All-America team

Individual All-America teams

AP Honorable Mention:

 Alvan Adams, Oklahoma
 Bill Andreas, Ohio State
 Kent Benson, Indiana
 Otis Birdsong, Houston
 Junior Bridgeman, Louisville
 Darryl Brown, Fordham
 Skip Brown, Wake Forest
 Joe Bryant, La Salle
 George Bucci, Manhattan
 Quinn Buckner, Indiana
 Charles Cleveland, Alabama
 Kevin Cluess, St. John's
 Bill Cook, Memphis State
 Wesley Cox, Louisville
 Brad Davis, Maryland
 Johnny Davis, Dayton
 Walter Davis, North Carolina
 Jacky Dorsey, Georgia
 Arnold Dugger, Oral Roberts
 Louis Dunbar, Houston
 Bo Ellis, Marquette
 Alex English, South Carolina
 Al Fleming, Arizona
 Jerry Fort, Nebraska
 Jeff Fosnes, Vanderbilt
 Terry Furlow, Michigan State
 John Garrett, Purdue
 Mike Glenn, Southern Illinois
 Ron Gottschalk, Vermont
 Steve Green, Indiana
 Ernie Grunfeld, Tennessee
 Ron Haigler, Penn
 Lindsay Hairston, Michigan State
 Glenn Hansen, LSU
 Tony Hanson, Connecticut
 Phil Hicks, Tulane
 Mo Howard, Maryland
 Hercle Ivy, Iowa State
 Jerry Jenkins, Mississippi State
 Eddie Johnson, Auburn
 Dahle Keehler, Wisconsin
 Rich Kelley, Stanford
 Bernard King, Tennessee
 Danny Knight, Kansas
 Mitch Kupchak, North Carolina
 Walter Luckett, Ohio
 Joe Meriweather, Southern Illinois
 John Murphy, UMass
 Frank Oleynick, Seattle
 Robert Parish, Centenary
 Chris Potter, Holy Cross
 John Ramsay, Seton Hall
 Bill Robinzine, DePaul
 Moe Rivers, NC State
 Rubén Rodríguez, Long Island
 Tree Rollins, Clemson
 Rick Schmidt, Illinois
 Lonnie Shelton, Oregon State
 Ricky Sobers, UNLV
 Rick Suttle, Kansas
 Monte Towe, NC State
 Mel Utley, St. John's
 Kerry Walker, Boston University
 Lloyd Walton, Marquette
 Bob Warren, Maine
 Richard Washington, UCLA
 Chuckie Williams, Kansas State
 Skip Wise, Clemson

See also
 1974–75 NCAA Division I men's basketball season

References

NCAA Men's Basketball All-Americans
All-Americans